Gandhara vietnamica is a moth of the family Erebidae first described by Vladimir Viktorovitch Dubatolov in 2012. It is found in Vietnam and possibly Thailand.

The length of the forewings is about 14 mm. The hindwings are unicolorous light yellow.

References

Moths described in 2012
Lithosiina